Henry Ian Cusick (born 17 April 1967) is a Peruvian-Scottish actor of television, film, and theatre and a television director.

He is best known for his role as Desmond in the ABC television series Lost, for which he received a Primetime Emmy Award nomination. He also starred as Jesus in The Gospel of John, as Stephen Finch in the ABC political thriller series Scandal, as Marcus Kane in The CW science fiction series The 100, as Dr. Jonas Lear in The Passage on Fox, and as Russell "Russ" Taylor in the CBS action drama MacGyver.

Early life
Cusick was born in Trujillo, Peru, to a Peruvian mother, Esperanza Chávez, and a Scottish father, Henry Joseph Cusick. When he was two, his family moved to Madrid, Spain, then Glasgow, before moving to Trinidad and Tobago, where they lived for ten years. There Cusick attended Presentation College, San Fernando. He moved to Newton Mearns, a town just outside of Glasgow in Scotland, with his family at the age of fourteen. Cusick attended the Royal Scottish Academy of Music and Drama and was asked to resign in his second year there. He got his first acting role at the Citizens' Theatre as an understudy in the Christmas Panto playing a polar bear. He appeared in various productions for the Strathclyde Theatre Group in Glasgow. He is fluent in both English and Spanish, and was raised Roman Catholic.

Career
Cusick began his career as a classical theatre actor. His first leading roles onstage included Dorian Gray in The Picture of Dorian Gray with Rupert Everett, Hamlet in The Marovitz Hamlet, and Horner in The Country Wife. His 1994 performances as Torquato Tasso in the Edinburgh International Festival production of Torquato Tasso, and Creon in the Citizens' Theatre production of Oedipus, earned him a commendation at the 1995 Ian Charleson Awards for outstanding performance by a young actor in a classical theatre role.

On screen, after appearing in recurring roles in television series such as Casualty and The Book Group, he starred as Jesus Christ in the 2003 film The Visual Bible: The Gospel of John. His largest role to date came in 2005 when he was cast as Desmond Hume in the ABC series Lost. Originally a recurring guest star in the second season (for which he received an Emmy nomination), Cusick became a member of the main cast from seasons three to six. Cusick won the role when, while staying at the home of his friend Brian Cox, he met Cox's next-door neighbor, Carlton Cuse, the executive producer of Lost. Cusick stated he believes "a seed (was) planted, because they had been looking for either a Scottish or Irish character."

He also appeared as Theo Stoller in two episodes of season 5 of 24 and the 2007 film Hitman.  He stars in the direct-to-DVD film Dead Like Me: Life After Death, a continuation of the cult classic television show of the same name.

Cusick appeared in two episodes of Law & Order: Special Victims Unit in the twelfth season, playing Erik Weber, a vigilante with a Citizens Organized Against Predators group. He was in ABC's Scandal in 2011, but left the following year.

He also played Trent Marsh in Body of Proof and portrayed Marcus Kane until his character switched bodies with another actor in The 100, which premiered in March 2014.

Cusick also directed a short film called Dress, filmed in his home town, Kailua, Hawaii, winning the best short at HIFF and Peace on Earth Film Festival.

In 2017, Cusick partnered with tech start-up JamBios to promote its reminiscing and memory-sharing social platform. He plays the voice of Monty, the digital biographer, and recorded over 200 questions that Monty asks users to help spur their memories. Cusick's wife Annie is the curator of the JamBios Memory Gallery.

Personal life
Cusick and his wife Annie Cusick Wood are parents to three sons, Eli (born 1994), Lucas (born 1998), and Esau (born 2000) who lives in Edinburgh.

Filmography

Films

Television

Video games

Theatre
Stolzius in The Soldiers - Royal Lyceum Theatre (preview, Edinburgh International Festival)
Torquato Tasso in Torquato Tasso - Royal Lyceum Theatre, Edinburgh — Commendation, Ian Charleson Awards
Creon and The Messenger in Oedipus Rex  - Glasgow Citizens Theatre — Commendation, Ian Charleson Awards
Dorian Gray in The Picture of Dorian Gray - Glasgow Citizens Theatre
Horner in The Country Wife - Glasgow Citizens Theatre
Hamlet in The Marowitz Hamlet - Glasgow Citizens Theatre
McCann in The Birthday Party - Glasgow Citizens Theatre
Jeffrey in The Dying Gaul - Citizens Theatre
Nick in The LA Plays - Almeida Theatre, London
The Home Show Pieces for Citizens Theatre
Cassio in Othello - Royal Shakespeare Company
Demetrius in A Midsummer Night's Dream - Royal Shakespeare Company
Pompey in Antony and Cleopatra - Royal Shakespeare Company
Henry Green in Richard II - Royal National Theatre
Arthur in The Machine Wreckers - Royal National Theatre
Dollabella in Antony and Cleopatra - Royal National Theatre
Le Vicomte De Valmont in Les Liaisons Dangereuses - Liverpool Playhouse
Louis Ironson in Angels in America for 7:84 Theatre Company
Title role in Molière's Don Juan for Theatre Babel
Ross/Witch in Macbeth - Glasgow Citizens Theatre

References

External links

Official Website
Official Fan Site

Living people
1967 births
20th-century Scottish male actors
21st-century Scottish male actors
20th-century Peruvian male actors
21st-century Peruvian male actors
Alumni of the Royal Conservatoire of Scotland
British actors of Latin American descent
Peruvian emigrants to the United Kingdom
Peruvian expatriates in the United States
Peruvian male film actors
Peruvian people of Scottish descent
Royal Shakespeare Company members
Scottish expatriates in the United States
Scottish male film actors
Scottish male stage actors
Scottish male Shakespearean actors
Scottish male television actors
Scottish people of Peruvian descent